Mir Jan Muhammad Rizwi of Rohri, Sindh famous under his nom-de-plume Mir or Mir Janullah (died 1754) was chief Khalifa of Sufi Shah Inayat Shaheed who is related to have told people: "Who ever sees Janullah, sees me" for Janullah had reached the complete Fana fil Shaykh, the identification with his mystical leader. 

He witnessed the siege of Jhok and returned to Rohri after Shah Inayat's execution.

References

Sufism in Sindh
Sindhi people
Mughal Empire Sufis
Sufis of Sindh
People from Sukkur District
1754 deaths
Year of birth unknown